Hippodamia tredecimpunctata, commonly known as the thirteen-spot ladybeetle, is a species of lady beetle.

Description
Adult H. tredecimpunctata have domed backs, mainly oval, often shiny with short legs and antennae. They have two wing covers. They are usually red to orange in color. This species has thirteen dark or black spots. The larvae are slightly flattened and covered with miniature spines. Very small eggs are laid in groups of 10–50 on the undersides of leaves.

Range
The species is distributed throughout much the northern hemisphere-Europe, North Africa, European Russia, the Caucasus, Siberia, the Russian Far East,  Belarus, Ukraine, Moldova, Transcaucasia, Kazakhstan, Middle Asia, Western Asia, Afghanistan, Mongolia, China, the Korean Peninsula, Japan, North America. In North America, it can be found in Canada and the northern United States. The relative abundance of this species in North America has been associated with the introduction of the non-native coccinellid Coccinella septempunctata.

Habitat
It is a stenotypic (limited habitat) species most associated with wet meadows, lakesides, flood plains and river deltas, marshes, and in marshes and marshy alder thickets, carr and bodden on Carex, Sparganium, Phragmites, and on Salixlablokoff-Khnzorian, S. M. 1982. Les Coccinelles Coleopteres- Coccinellidae Tribu Coccinellini des regions Palearctique et Orientale. Boubee. Paris. 568 pp.

Biology
It feeds on Aphis farinosa and occurs on grasses and sedges associated with Sipha glyceriae'' and on aphids associated with Gramineae, Umbelliferae, and some other plants  It also feeds on Erysiphales on reeds, before the emergence of aphids It has also found on cane, rotten hay, detritus, and under peeled-off bark.

References 

Coccinellidae
Insects used as insect pest control agents
Biological pest control beetles
Beetles described in 1758
Taxa named by Carl Linnaeus